"Where's the Love" is a song by American pop rock band Hanson. It was released on September 1, 1997, as the second single from the band's debut album, Middle of Nowhere (1997). Internationally, it was a successful follow-up to "MMMBop", reaching the top 10 in Australia, Canada, Finland, Hungary, New Zealand, and the United Kingdom. In the United States, "Where's the Love" did not chart on the Billboard Hot 100 due to rules regarding commercial releases, but it peaked at number 27 on the Billboard Hot 100 Airplay chart and number six on the Billboard Mainstream Top 40.

Critical reception
British magazine Music Week rated the song five out of five and named it Single of the Week, writing, "The siblings prove "MMMBop" was no fluke with this strong follow up, which shows their musicianship to greater effect than their debut. A second number one is a possibility." David Fricke from Rolling Stone stated that "you don't have to be a Bop magazine subscriber to fall for the cheesy bounce" of "Where's the Love". Alan Jackson from The Times said, "The "MMMBop" brats are back with a similarly infectious and chartbound slice of kid-rock."

Track listings
All songs were written by Isaac Hanson, Taylor Hanson, and Zac Hanson. Additional writers are noted in small text.

 UK CD1
 "Where's the Love" (radio edit)  – 3:47
 "Madeline" (live at the Hard Rock)  – 3:21
 "Man from Milwaukee" (live at the Hard Rock) – 2:58
 "Where's the Love" (album version)  – 4:12

 UK CD2
 "Where's the Love" (album version)  – 4:12
 "Look at You"  – 4:28
 "Where's the Love" (Tommy D Londinium dub)  – 6:37
 "Where's the Love" (Tommy D Ministry dub)  – 8:39

 UK cassette single
 "Where's the Love" (radio edit)  – 3:47
 "Where's the Love" (album version)  – 4:12
 "Look at You"  – 4:28

 European CD single
 "Where's the Love" (album version)  – 4:12
 "Look at You"  – 4:28

 Australian CD single
 "Where's the Love" (radio edit)  – 3:47
 "Where's the Love" (Berman Brothers Mix)  – 3:58
 "Where's the Love" (Tommy D Londinium dub)  – 6:37
 "Where's the Love" (Tommy D Ministry dub)  – 8:39

Charts

Weekly charts

Year-end charts

Certifications

Release history

References

1996 songs
1997 singles
Hanson (band) songs
Mercury Records singles
Music videos directed by Tamra Davis
Songs written by Isaac Hanson
Songs written by Mark Hudson (musician)
Songs written by Taylor Hanson
Songs written by Zac Hanson